The siege of Novara was a battle that took place in the summer and autumn of 1495 during the Italian War of 1494–1495. While king Charles VIII of France was retreating to the north after facing rebellions in the recently conquered Kingdom of Naples, and managed to escape the destruction of his army at the Battle of Fornovo (6 July 1495), his cousin and future king Louis d'Orleans opened a second front by attacking the Duchy of Milan (which had defected to France's enemies) and occupying the city of Novara. In an effort to retrieve it, the Milanese army and their League of Venice allies besieged Novara for three months and fourteen days. Suffering from severe starvation and disease, the French lost about 2000 soldiers before Louis had to surrender and withdraw.

Premise 
In the early phase of the French invasion of Italy in September 1494, the French king Charles VIII and his cousin Louis d'Orléans had concluded an alliance with Ludovico "il Moro" Sforza, the Duke of Milan, against their common enemy Alfonso II of Naples. Alfonso claimed the Milanese dukedom, while Charles claimed the Neapolitan kingship, and so collaboration between the two seemed opportune. On the other hand, the French kings also had pretensions on the Duchy of Milan, which Louis in particular was keen on enforcing when given the chance.

Louis d'Orléans had not followed Charles on his march to Naples but had remained in his own fief of Asti, having fallen ill with malaria in September 1494. While the Franco-Milanese advance towards Naples went swiftly, accomplished on 22 February 1495, Charles' harsh policy of violent reprisals against any resistance resulted in death and destruction across cities and country along the peninsula, to the horror of the Italian population and courts. This not only alienated the Milanese from the French but also spurred neutral states into active opposition towards the invaders. On 30 March 1495, the Italian states of Venice, Milan, Florence, Naples, Genoa, Mantua and the Papal States, as well as Spain and the Holy Roman Empire, concluded the League of Venice to drive the French out of Italy.

With the Milanese defection to the enemy camp, Louis saw his opportunity. He now threatened to implement his plan to conquer the Duchy of Milan, which he considered his right, being a descendant of Valentina Visconti.

Conflict

French advance stopped 
On 11 June 1495, Louis with his troops occupied the Milanese city of Novara, which was given to him by treason, and went as far as Vigevano. Ludovico il Moro then took refuge with his family in the Rocca del Castello in Milan but, not feeling equally safe, he meditated on abandoning the duchy to take refuge in Spain. The firm opposition of his wife Beatrice d'Este and some members of the council convinced him to desist.However, the state was suffering from a severe financial crisis, there was no money to pay for the army and the people threatened the revolt. Philippe de Commines wrote that, if the Duke of Orleans had advanced only a hundred paces, the Milanese army would have crossed the Ticino again, and he would have managed to enter Milan since some noble citizens had offered to let him in.

Ludovico did not resist the tension and fell ill, perhaps due to a stroke (according to the hypothesis of some historians), since, as reported by the chronicler Malipiero, he had become paralytic of a hand, he never left the bedroom and was rarely seen. Malipiero, however, is the only one to report this strange disease, moreover, the chronology is uncertain, as it disagrees with that of Sanudo, who makes no mention of it. The anonymous Ferrarese chronicler limits himself to saying that "the Duke of Milan was sick at this time in Milan" but the illness was perhaps an excuse to justify the fact that his wife Beatrice d'Este had, as in a sort of regency, taken over the government of the state and the war in her place and that, as Bernardino Zambotti reports, she had been appointed governor of Milan together with her brother Alfonso, who, however, soon fell ill with syphilis. She secured the support and loyalty of the Milanese nobles, took the necessary measures for the defence and abolished some taxes which were hated by the people.

The army of the League had meanwhile moved near Vigevano. Captain General of the Sforza army was then Galeazzo Sanseverino, while the Serenissima sent Bernardo Contarini, provveditore of the stradiotti, to the rescue of Milan. However, in June the Lordship of Venice - according to Malipiero - had meanwhile discovered how the Duke of Ferrara, Beatrice's father, together with the Florentines, kept King Charles informed every day of everything that was being done in Venice as in Lombardy, then secretly supplying the Duke of Orleans in Novara, as he sought the king's help in the recovery of the Polesine, stolen from him by the Venetians at the time of the Salt War. In addition, the leader , Galeazzo's brother, was accused of double game with the king of France. The suspicions were corroborated by the fact that the latter had responded with little respect to Marquis Francesco Gonzaga when the latter during a council of war accused him of not collaborating in war operations.

Not being able to count, therefore, on her father's help, on June 27 Beatrice d'Este went alone, without her husband, to the military camp of Vigevano, both to supervise the order and to animate her captains to move against the Duke of Orleans, who in those days was constantly making raids in that area. Guicciardini's opinion is that if the latter had attempted the assault immediately, he would have taken Milan since the defence resided only in Galeazzo Sanseverino, but Beatrice's demonstration of strength was able to confuse him in making him believe the defences superior to what they were so that he did not dare to try his luck and retired to Novara. The hesitation was fatal to him, as it allowed Galeazzo to reorganize the troops and surround him, thus forcing him to a long and exhausting siege.

On 28 June, the camp moved to Cassolnovo, a direct possession of Beatrice. The woman supervised the order of the troops and the camp, then returned to Vigevano, where she remained housed, so as to keep herself immediately informed of the operations. Some severed heads of the French were brought to her by the stratioti, and she rewarded them with a ducat for each. According to Sanudo, however, she was disliked by everyone for the hatred they brought to her husband Ludovico, who was safe in the castle of Milan and from there made his measures.

Siege of Novara 
Francesco II Gonzaga, Marquess of Mantua, who had played an important role during the Battle of Fornovo (one which was arguably exaggerated later), moved his troops to Casallogiano on 19 July 1495, and began to besiege to Novara. On 23 July, the Venetian government nominated Francesco captain-general of their forces and awarded him an annual salary of 2000 ducats, later handing him the baton and standard of his new rank.

Finally recovering from the disease in early August, Ludovico went with his wife Beatrice to the Camp of Novara, where they resided in the following weeks.

Relations between Beatrice and Bernardo Contarini remained cordial, despite the fact that among the Venetians, the father and husband were not in good blood, and the common opinion was - according to Malipiero - that the Serenissima should have ordered Bernardo to "cut into pieces Duke Ludovico and Duke Ercole di Ferrara ". According to Pietro Bembo, Bernard himself offered to assassinate Ludovico to put an end to his duplicity. This is because, in September 1495, Ludovico had given orders to prevent the Venetian troops from crossing the Ticino and therefore repatriating to the Republic, leaving them without supplies and vehicles. Contarini's plan had no implementation either due to the prudence of his colleagues - Melchiorre Trevisan and Luca Pisani - and because in October 1495 Venice had moved a contingent of almost 10,000 men to Cremasco and Bergamo, threatening Ludovico invasion if he had not released his soldiers still stranded in the Duchy.

The besieging troops from the League of Venice – mostly Milanese and Venetians – lacked artillery to bombard Novara, and Ludovico also preferred not to destroy one of his own cities. (According to other sources, the attackers did employ field guns against Novara, but had to use earth, fascines, trenches and gabions to protect their artillery from the French cannons firing at them from the city). Instead, the allies resorted to starving the French out. They cut off Novara's water supplies by diverting the river, burnt the land around the city, and closely surrounded the city day and night to make leaving or entering Novara and provisioning it impossible. As Louis had fled inside Novara in such a panic, he had also failed to provision his army properly beforehand to be able to withstand a siege. The little grain they did have could not be ground to flour to bake bread without flowing water to power the town's mills. A supply convoy sent by Charles from Asti was easily captured by the besiegers. Moreover, the League spread false rumours into the city that Charles VIII had fallen in the Battle of Fornovo, or that he was too busy trying to seduce local princess Anna Solarno to relieve the French soldiers inside Novara, demoralising the defenders.

The city was plagued by famine and epidemics that decimated the French army. A French chronicler wrote: 'Every day some were starved to death.' To save as many supplies for his soldiers as possible, Louis decided to seize all the food of the civilians, and 'drove out all those of the populace who were poor and useless ['paupertatem omnem ac inutilem plebem exclusit']. A great many suffered from fever and diarrhoea due to the poor quality of the food and drinking of water.' According to the Mantuan ambassador in Milan, the civilians who were thrown out of Novara, mostly women and children, 'became prey to the stradiots in Venetian pay and were reduced to begging in the camp of the besiegers.' The Duke of Orleans, also ill with malarial fevers, urged his men to resist with the false promise that the king's help would soon come. However, the 20,000 Swiss mercenaries who Charles had hired as reinforcements would not arrive until after Louis had been forced to evacuate the city and give it back to the Milanese.

Peace negotiations 
The critical conditions of the French military inside the city forced them to propose a truce to the Milanese on 21 September. Charles invited Francesco to visit him at Vercelli to negotiate an armistice; Francesco quested and obtained permission from the Venetian authorities to commence talks on their behalf, but their instructions were ambiguous. Louis was finally forced to cede the city on 24 September 1495 at the behest of King Charles, who was returning to France, and the enterprise ended in nothing.

About 2000 French soldiers had succumbed to disease or starvation by the time Novara was liberated, and the sight of the survivors shocked a French ambassador: "...so lean and meagre that they looked more like dead than living people; and truly, I believe never men endured more misery." Hundreds more died after they evacuated Novara, being left on the side of the roads as Louis withdrew his beaten forces. Louis was nevertheless burning with desire for revenge, and to the horror of a French diplomat, he urged Charles to stop the negotiations, keep fighting and attack Milan as soon as the Swiss reinforcements had arrived. However, the peace negotiations between captain-general Francesco and king Charles appear to have been very amicable, publicly exchanging compliments, with Charles giving Francesco two beautiful horses as a gift on 6 October, to which Francesco gifted Charles two beautiful horses in return a few days later.

On 9 October 1495, Charles VIII and Ludovico Sforza concluded the Peace of Vercelli between France and Milan. The Venetians and Spanish claimed they were not properly consulted, and objected strongly to Sforza's and Francesco II Gonzaga, Marquess of Mantua's alleged unilateral diplomatic actions. The Venetians particularly objected to the following agreements:
 Ludovico Sforza had permitted the French to use the port of Genoa to resupply their garrisons in Naples.
 Francesco Gonzaga had consented to a prisoner exchange between Mathieu, Bastard of Bourbon (captured at Fornovo, died 19 August 1505) and Fregosino Fregoso (a Genoese who had fought for the League).

As a result, the Veneto-Milanese alliance rapidly deteriorated.

References

Bibliography 

 
 
 
 
 
 
 
 
 
 
 

1495 in Europe
15th century in the Duchy of Milan
Novara
Novara 1495
Novara 1495
Novara 1495
Novara 1495
Novara
Novara
Italian War of 1494–1495